Silver Star Mountain Resort (Silver Star) is a ski resort located near Silver Star Provincial Park in the Shuswap Highland of the Monashee Mountains, 22 km northeast of the city of Vernon, British Columbia, Canada. Silver Star's snow season runs from late November to mid-April, weather permitting. Silver Star provides summer lift access for mountain biking and hiking from the end of June through September.

Silver Star's current government leadership consists of local mayor Amanda Shatzko, MP Mel Arnold, and MLA Harwinder Sandhu.

Alpine Skiing Terrain

Silver Star has an annual snowfall of 700 cm or  There are a total of 132 marked trails, with a vertical drop of 760 m (2,500 ft).

The resort spans over four mountain faces, giving it four distinct areas:

Vance Creek offers most of the beginner and intermediate runs on the mountain. Therefore, it is usually the busiest face of the mountain and has mostly groomed runs along with intermediate and expert runs. Vance Creek is serviced by the "Comet Six-pack Express" which ferries skiers from below the Village base and Silver Woods areas to the summit at 1,915 m. The "Summit Express” is a gondola that takes skiers directly from the Village to the summit as well.

Attridge is a small area beside Vance Creek which offers a wide variety of glade and groomed runs. The "Alpine Meadows" chair is a fixed grip quad and offers ski-in/ski-out access to the mountain from the developed area called Alpine Meadows.

Silver Woods is a recent expansion of the resort which is part of a catchment below the Comet Express and is serviced by the "Silver Woods Express" which is a detachable high-speed quad. Silver Woods offers many intermediate treed and glade runs and is an access point to the hill from the "Knoll Residential Area".

Putnam Creek is an area which introduces skiers to more difficult terrain than the rest of the mountain. Most of the runs in the Putnam Creek area are black diamond and double black diamond runs consisting of steep lines with moguls and tree skiing. The "Powder Gulch Express", a Detachable high-speed quad gives lift access to the many runs and a way out with the "Home Run T-bar" back to the village.

History

The Early Days

Vernon resident Bert Thorburn became the first person to ski in the Silver Star area in 1930. It was powered by an old four cylinder engine. The cooling system was a 40-gallon water drum hooked up to the radiator. For $.50, you could ski all day.

A few years later the ski hill was moved to Lavington on Michael Freeman's farm on the north slope above Highway 6.  This had one or two rope tows and a shack for warming up with an oil barrel wood fired stove. But skiing was limited to a few months of the year.  The Ski Club had their eyes on Silver Star Mountain where they could ski 6 months of the year.  But Silver Star was part of a Class A provincial park with no development allowed.

Silver Star Sports got approval from the Province to build a ski hill in the Class A park in the summer of 1957. In 1958 the final three kilometers of the Silver Star road was pushed through to the village area.

Construction of two rope-tow lifts and an A-frame day lodge were built in 1958. In 1959 a poma lift was installed from the  level at the parking lot to the top of SilverStar Mountain, replacing the rope tow. In 1964, new T-bars were installed to replace the slower rope tows and in 1965 a second A-frame structure was added to the day lodge. In 1967 and 1968 the Summit and Yellow Chairs (6,000 feet) built by GMD Mueller were installed.

SilverStar Mountain Resort Era

In 1981 Silver Star Sports became Silver Star Mountain Resorts Ltd. In 1983 the Putnam Station Hotel was built. From 1984-1990 many new hotels and amenities are built on the hill. In 1990, the Silver Queen chair was built by Yan and replaced by a Doppelmayr quad chair and serves as the bunny hill. In 1991 the original Putnam Creek and Vance Creek express quads were built and opened up terrain. In 2001, the Schumann family, owners of Big White Ski Resort since 1985, reached an agreement in principle with the Judd Buchanan, the majority shareholder of Silver Star Mountain Resort, on the purchase of the majority assets of Silver Star Mountain Resort.

In 2002 Silver Star Mountain Resort invested in new chair lifts and opening up new terrain followed by further expansion in 2005/06 to open up the Silver Woods ski area. The Comet Express, made by Leitner-Poma and carrying a rated 2600 passengers per hour, is Canada's largest 6-passenger chairlift.  2005 saw the expansion of the Silver Star Bike Park to start using the Comet Six-Pack chairlift for biking.

In 2012, following the death of father Desmond Schumann, Jane Cann received 100% stake in Siver Star Resort. Cann's brother Peter Schumann was given ownership of Big White.  Formerly operated as a joint venture, the two resorts became separate entities.

On July 14, 2018, Silver Star held an opening event for its new Gondola, the Schumann Summit Express.  The Gondola was manufactured by Doppelmayr. It can transport skiers and mountain bikers from the mid-mountain village to the summit in 4.4 minutes.

On December 3, 2019 it was announced that SilverStar had been sold to Powdr Corporation, a Utah-based owner of ski resorts.

Nordic Skiing

SilverStar is renowned for its cross-country skiing facilities.  SilverStar offers extensive cross-country skiing with more than 105 kilometres (60 miles) of daily groomed trails.  The lower trail system is directly accessible from the village, but cross country skiers can also take advantage of summit trails (lift-served).  Five km of trails are lit for night skiing. The extensive trail system allows for an array of abilities to take in the sport, and access to nearby Sovereign Lake Nordic Centre draws experts including the Canadian National Team for regular early-season training.

Terrain park

SilverStar's terrain park consists of an extensive rail garden and also has an assortment of table-top and step-up jumps for all abilities. Silver Star also has an Aerial Training Site, a Dual Moguls Race Course, and a race center which hosted the 2005 Canadian Masters Slalom Championships.

Silver StarBike Park
Expanded in 2005 to start using the Comet Six-Pack the bike park features more than 50 km of downhill bike trails and more than 30 km of XC trail.  The bike park features a 4 bike carrier lift system that uses a bike carrier on every second chair so you hardly ever wait in line.  Biking terrain (XC and DH combined) consists of roughly 23% beginner green trails, 43% intermediate blue trails and 34% advanced and expert trails.

On-mountain activities
Apart from skiing and snowboarding, there are several other on-mountain activities.
These are:
Tube Town 
Outdoor Skating 
 Snowmobiling
Mini Z Snowmobile Park 
Sleigh Rides 
Snowshoeing
 Day spa
Indoor Rock Climbing 
Fitness Centre
Bike Park
Hiking trails

SilverStar’s My1Pass; is an all-inclusive seasons pass offering seven activities including downhill and cross-country skiing, snowboarding, tubing, skating, Fat Biking and snowshoeing.

See also
List of ski areas and resorts in Canada
 Skiing
 Snowboarding
Mountain biking

References

External links 

 
 

Ski areas and resorts in the Okanagan
Populated places in the Regional District of North Okanagan
Monashee Mountains
Populated places in the Okanagan Country